The Traena Music Festival is held annually in the municipality of Træna in Nordland county, Norway.  The festival is held on the islands of Husøya and Sanna.  The islands are only accessible by ferry boat from the mainland in Lurøy.

Venues have included an ancient cave, a church with blacked-out windows (to block out the Midnight sun which shines for 23 hours a day), and tents.  The festival attracts many people from neighbouring communities who visit the camp to enjoy the music and unique nature of the festival.

History
Nine thousand years ago, some pioneers migrated to these islands out in the Norwegian Sea. There was not much land that could be farmed nor many trees that could be felled, but the richness of the surrounding ocean made it possible for people to settle. Even today, this is one of the richest fishing grounds in Norway.

Over the centuries that followed the ocean richness has supported the small population of 400 people who became important trading partners in the international fish market.  Most of what comes out of the ocean is exported.  This also means that this isolated island always has been a highly international place.  This international music festival celebrates the history and culture of Træna by bringing new Norwegian "fresh" musical expression into the open in different genres.

References
Trænafestivalen home page
http://news.bbc.co.uk/1/hi/programmes/from_our_own_correspondent/4138714.stm
http://thescotsman.scotsman.com/features/Fest-in-peace.4301574.jp
http://www.cloud-mine.nl/2015/08/17/tr%C3%A6nafestivalen-2015/
http://www.cloud-mine.nl/2013/07/13/tr%C3%A6na-the-sound-of-the-arctic-circle/
http://www.guardian.co.uk/travel/2008/jul/21/norway.festivals?page=all

External links
 YouTube movie about the festival made by Kelly King and Olaf Furniss in 2008

Music festivals in Norway
Træna
Folk festivals in Norway